Vazhenkada Vijayan is a senior Kathakali exponent and a retired principal of Kerala Kalamandalam, the performing art institute where he was trained in the classical dance-drama from Kerala in southern India.

Life

A son and disciple of Kathakali artiste Padma Shri Vazhenkada Kunchu Nair, Vijayan is noted for his roles in the categories of the "Virtuous Pachcha", the anti-heroic Kathi and the semi-realistic minukku roles.

Vijayan won the Central Sangeet Natak Academy 2012 award for Kathakali.

A native of Vazhenkada in Malappuram district, he now lives in the Kathakali village of Vellinezhi in Palakkad district. His wife's name is Rajalakshmi.

References

Kathakali exponents
Dancers from Kerala
Malayali people
Indian male dancers
Recipients of the Sangeet Natak Akademi Award
People from Malappuram district
20th-century Indian dancers